Golur-e Bala (also Romanized as Golūr-e Bālā; also known as Golūr) is a village in Kelarabad Rural District, Kelarabad District, Abbasabad County, Mazandaran Province, Iran. At the 2006 census, its population was 462, in 131 families.

References 

Populated places in Abbasabad County